Uinta County is a county in the U.S. state of Wyoming. As of the 2020 United States Census, the population was 20,450. Its county seat is Evanston. Its south and west boundary lines abut the Utah state line.

Uinta County comprises the Evanston, WY Micropolitan Statistical Area.

History
Uinta County was created on December 1, 1869 by the legislature of the Wyoming Territory, with its temporary seat located at Fort Bridger.

Originally, it ran along the entire western border of Wyoming, including Yellowstone National Park. The county was named for Utah's Uinta Mountains, which are visible from many places in the county. The county was given its present boundaries in 1911 when Lincoln County was carved out of the northern part of Uinta County.

Geography
It is the second-smallest county in Wyoming by area.

Geology
The 161 km wide western North American Fold and thrust belt extends from Alaska to Mexico, forming several northerly trending thrust faults in southwest Wyoming, including the Crawford, Absaroka and Hogsback (Darby), which formed from the Late Jurassic through the early Eocene. The Painter Reservoir Field was discovered in 1977 from the 407 m thick Nuggest Sandstone which forms an anticline structural trap in the hanging wall of the Absaroka thrust plate, at a depth of about 3 km.

National protected area
Wasatch National Forest (part)

State protected areas
Fort Bridger State Historic Site
Bear River State Park

Major highways
 - Interstate 80 
 - U.S. Highway 189

Adjacent counties
Lincoln County - north
Rich County, Utah - west
Summit County, Utah - south and southwest
Sweetwater County - east

Demographics

2016
As of 2016 the largest self-reported ancestry groups in Uinta County, Wyoming are:

2015
As of 2015 the largest self-reported ancestry groups in Uinta County, Wyoming are:

2000 census
As of the 2000 United States Census, there were 19,742 people, 6,823 households, and 5,144 families in the county. The population density was 10 people per square mile (4/km2). There were 8,011 housing units at an average density of 4 per square mile (1/km2). The racial makeup of the county was 94.32% White, 0.11% Black or African American, 0.87% Native American, 0.27% Asian, 0.07% Pacific Islander, 2.86% from other races, and 1.50% from two or more races. 5.34% of the population were Hispanic or Latino of any race. 27.7% were of English, 14.8% German, 8.3% American and 6.9% Irish ancestry.

There were 6,823 households, out of which 44.70% had children under the age of 18 living with them, 61.20% were married couples living together, 9.90% had a female householder with no husband present, and 24.60% were non-families. 20.90% of all households were made up of individuals, and 5.60% had someone living alone who was 65 years of age or older. The average household size was 2.84 and the average family size was 3.31.

The county population contained 33.50% under the age of 18, 9.00% from 18 to 24, 29.20% from 25 to 44, 21.40% from 45 to 64, and 7.00% who were 65 years of age or older. The median age was 31 years. For every 100 females there were 103.80 males. For every 100 females age 18 and over, there were 100.30 males.

The median income for a household in the county was $44,544, and the median income for a family was $49,520. Males had a median income of $37,500 versus $21,450 for females. The per capita income for the county was $16,994. About 7.80% of families and 9.90% of the population were below the poverty line, including 11.90% of those under age 18 and 7.30% of those age 65 or over.

2010 census
As of the 2010 United States Census, there were 21,118 people, 7,668 households, and 5,577 families in the county. The racial makeup of the county was 92.4% white, 0.8% American Indian, 0.3% black or African American, 0.3% Asian, 0.2% Pacific islander, 4.1% from other races, and 2.0% from two or more races. Those of Hispanic or Latino origin made up 8.8% of the population. In terms of ancestry, 33.4% were English, 23.0% were German, 12.0% were Irish, 6.5% were Scottish, 5.1% were Scotch-Irish, and 3.3% were American.

Of the 7,668 households, 39.8% had children under the age of 18 living with them, 58.3% were married couples living together, 9.7% had a female householder with no husband present, 27.3% were non-families, and 22.6% of all households were made up of individuals. The average household size was 2.72 and the average family size was 3.19. The median age was 33.9 years.

The median income for a household in the county was $58,346 and the median income for a family was $68,949. Males had a median income of $54,766 versus $30,561 for females. The per capita income for the county was $24,460. About 8.2% of families and 12.1% of the population were below the poverty line, including 14.6% of those under age 18 and 7.7% of those age 65 or over.

Communities

City
 Evanston (county seat)

Towns
 Bear River
 Lyman
 Mountain View

Unincorporated communities
 Aspen
 Millburne
 Robertson

Ghost towns
 Almy
 Bear River City 
 Fort Supply
 Piedmont

Census-designated places
 Carter
 Fort Bridger
 Lonetree
 Robertson
 Urie

Government and infrastructure
The Wyoming Department of Health Wyoming State Hospital, a psychiatric facility, is located in Evanston. The facility was operated by the Wyoming Board of Charities and Reform until that agency was dissolved as a result of a state constitutional amendment passed in November 1990.

See also

National Register of Historic Places listings in Uinta County, Wyoming
Uintatherium, a namesake fossil mammal discovered there
Wyoming
List of cities and towns in Wyoming
List of counties in Wyoming
Wyoming statistical areas

References

 
1869 establishments in Wyoming Territory
Populated places established in 1869